The 2021–22 Liga de Expansión MX season is the second professional season of the second-tier football division in Mexico. The season is divided into two championships - the Torneo Apertura and the Torneo Clausura — each in an identical format and each contested by the same seventeen teams. The Apertura tournament will begin in the summer of 2021. The Clausura tournament will begin in January 2022.

Changes from the previous season
The Liga de Expansión MX is a Mexican football league founded in 2020 as part of the Mexican Football Federation's "Stabilization Project", which has the primary objective of rescuing the financially troubled teams from the Ascenso MX and prevent the disappearance of a second-tier league in Mexico, for which there will be no promotion and relegation during the following six years. The project also attempts for Liga MX and former Ascenso MX teams to consolidate stable projects with solid basis, sports-wise and administrative-wise, financially wise and in infrastructure.

At first it was reported that the  Irapuato were promoted from the Liga Premier de México in 2021. However, on June 3, 2021, the Mexican Football Federation announced the opening of a selection process to choose the club that would occupy the Liga Premier 3 place,  because Irapuato must still meet some requirements to compete in the Liga de Expansión MX, three Liga Premier clubs (Durango, Irapuato and Matamoros), were chosen for an audit process that would determine the winner of the promotion. On July 5, 2021, it was confirmed that no team undergoing the certification audit approved the procedure, so there will be no club promoted from the Liga Premier, finally, the Liga de Expansión will be play with 17 teams.

As of the this season, C.F. Monterrey will have its own team participating in the Liga de Expansión MX, which will be called Raya2.

As of 2021 Tepatitlán F.C. will be considered as a full member team of the Liga de Expansión MX, leaving the status of guest club with which it participated in the previous season.

The league format will be modified, with the top four ranked teams from the tournament general table advancing directly to the quarter–finals, while clubs ranked between fifth and twelfth place will play the reclassification round.

Stadiums and locations

Personnel and kits

Managerial changes

Torneo Grita México
The 2021 Torneo Apertura Grita México will be the first tournament of the season. The tournament was renamed Torneo Apertura Grita México 2021 with the intention of encouraging fans in the stands not to scream an offensive chant after a goal kick. The tournament began on 27 July 2021. The defending champions are Tepatitlán.

Regular season

Standings

Positions by Round

Results
Each team plays once all other teams in 16 rounds regardless of it being a home or away match.

Regular Season statistics

Top goalscorers 
Players sorted first by goals scored, then by last name.

Source:Liga de Expansión MX

Hat-tricks 

(H) – Home ; (A) – Away

Attendance

Per team

Source: Liga de Expansión MX

Highest and lowest

Source: Liga de Expansión MX

Final phase

Reclassification

|}

Matches

Bracket

Quarter-finals
The first legs were played on 1–2 December, and the second legs were played on 4–5 December.

|}

First leg

Second leg

Tampico Madero won 4–2 on aggregate.

Sinaloa won 2–0 on aggregate.

Atlante won 2–0 on aggregate.

Celaya won 3–1 on aggregate.

Semi-finals
The first legs were played on 8–9 December, and the second legs were played on 11–12 December.

|}

First leg

Second leg

Tampico Madero won 2–0 on aggregate.

Atlante won 3–2 on aggregate.

Final
The first leg was played on 15 December, and the second leg will be played on 18 December.

|}

First leg

Second leg

Atlante won 3–0 on aggregate.

Clausura 2022

The Clausura tournament began on 5 January 2022.

Regular season

Standings

Positions by Round

Results
Each team plays once all other teams in 16 rounds regardless of it being a home or away match.

Regular Season statistics

Top goalscorers 
Players sorted first by goals scored, then by last name.

Source:Liga de Expansión MX

Hat-tricks 

(H) – Home ; (A) – Away

Attendance

Per team

Highest and lowest

Source: Liga Expansión MX

Final phase

Reclassification

|}

Matches

Bracket

Quarter-finals
The first legs will be played between 26–28 April, and the second legs will be played between 29 April–1 May.

|}

First leg

Second leg

5–5 on aggregate. Atlético Morelia advanced due to being the higher seed in the classification table

Sonora won 1–0 on aggregate.

Atlante won 4–1 on aggregate.

Celaya won 3–1 on aggregate.

Semi-finals
The first legs will be played between 3–5 May, and the second legs will be played between 6–8 May.

|}

First leg

Second leg

Atlético Morelia won 1–0 on aggregate.

Sonora won 2–1 on aggregate.

Finals
The first leg will be played  on 11 May, and the second leg will be played on 14 May.

|}

First leg

Second leg

Atlético Morelia won 2–0 on aggregate.

Campeón de Campeones Final

The Campeón de Campeones Final is a two-legged playoff between the winners of the Apertura and Clausura tournaments and the Liga de Expansión MX Super cup. The final would not be played if the same team wins both the Apertura and Clausura tournaments. The higher ranked team on the aggregate table for the 2021–22 season will play the second leg at home.
The winner of the final will receive a prize of $MXN 5 million.

First Leg

Second Leg

1–1 on aggregate. Atlante won 5–4 on penalty kicks.

Annual awards

Coefficient table
As of the 2020–21 season, the promotion and relegation between Liga MX and Liga de Expansión MX (formerly known as Ascenso MX) was suspended, however, the coefficient table will be used to establish the payment of fines that will be used for the development of the clubs of the silver circuit.

Per Article 24 of the competition regulations, the payment of $MXN3 million from Liga de Expansión clubs will be distributed among the last three positioned in the coefficient table as follows: Last place pays 1.5 million, the penultimate place pays 1 million, and the fifteenth place pays 500 thousand. If any affiliate club or new club from the Liga Premier is ranked in the bottom three at the end of the season, they are exempt from paying any fine and it will not be covered by any other club. Any club that does not pay their corresponding fine, for any reason, will be dissafiliated. The team that finishes last on the table will start the following season with a coefficient of zero. If the last ranked team, which was Pumas Tabasco, repeats as the last ranked team in the 2021–22 season coefficient table, they will be fined an additional $MXN1 million.

{|class="wikitable sortable" style="text-align: center;"
!width=28|
!width=150|Team
!width=40|
!width=40|
!width=40|
!width=40|
!width=40|
!width=40|
!width=45|
!width=45|
!width=50|
!width=45|
!Fine
|-style="text-align:center;background:#BBFFBB;"
|1
|align=left|Atlético Morelia
|19||13||26||29||28||25||140||81||||+23||align=center rowspan=9|Safe from paying any fine
|-style="text-align:center;background:#BBFFBB;"
|2
|align=left|Atlante
|20||11||28||22||31||23||135||81||||+35
|-style="text-align:center;background:#BBFFBB;"
|3
|align=left|Celaya
|12||13||32||25||25||27||134||81||||+34
|-style="text-align:center;background:#BBFFBB;"
|4
|align=left|Zacatecas
|14||20||23||24||19||24||124||81||||+22
|-style="text-align:center;background:#BBFFBB;"
|5
|align=left|Sonora
|15||8||28||26||21||23||121||81||||+18
|-style="text-align:center;background:#BBFFBB;"
|6
|align=left|Tepatitlán
|colspan="2"|Serie A de México||23||22||18||22||85||62||0||–4
|-style="text-align:center;background:#BBFFBB
|7
|align=left|Sinaloa
|14||5||14||18||37||19||107||81||0||–1
|-style="text-align:center;background:#BBFFBB;"
|8
|align=left|UdeG
|15||13||13||11||25||29||106||81||||–4
|-style="text-align:center;background:#BBFFBB;"
|9
|align=left|Oaxaca
|21||6||13||19||16||31||106||81||||–5
|-style="text-align:center;background:#BBBBBB;"
|10
|align=left|Tapatío
|colspan="2"|Did not exist||21||22||14||22||79||62||||–12||align=center |
|-style="text-align:center;background:#BBFFBB;"
|11
|align=left|Tampico Madero
|17||12||23||16||22||11||101||81||||+5||Safe from paying any fine
|-style="text-align:center;background:#BBBBBB;
|12
|align=left|Tlaxcala
|colspan="2"|Serie A de México||18||19||18||22||77||62||||–17||align=center |
|-style="text-align:center;background:#BBFFBB;"
|13
|align=left|Cancún
|13||3||24||21||13||23||97||81||||–11||align=center rowspan=2|Safe from paying any fine
|-style="text-align:center;background:#BBFFBB;"
|14
|align=left|Venados
|8||13||16||17||21||22||97||81||||–20
|-style="text-align:center;background:#FFDDDD;
|15
|align=left|UAT (F)
|10||16||13||13||19||18||89||81||||–27||$MXN500 thousand
|-style="text-align:center;background:#BBBBBB;
|16
|align=left|Pumas Tabasco
|colspan="2"|Did not exist||0||0||23||12||35||32||||–11||align=center |
|-style="text-align:center;background:#BBBBBB;
|17
|align=left|Raya2
|colspan="4"|Did not exist||17||17||34||32||||–5||
|}
Last update: 15 April 2022
 Rules for fine payment: 1) Fine coefficient; 2) Goal difference; 3) Number of goals scored; 4) Head-to-head results between tied teams; 5) Number of goals scored away; 6) Fair Play points
 F''' = Fined.
Source: Liga de Expansión

Aggregate table 
The Aggregate table is the general ranking for the 2021–22 season. This table is a sum of the Apertura 2021 and Clausura 2022 tournament standings. The aggregate table is used to determine seeding for the "Campeón de Campeones" Final.

Notes

See also 
2021–22 Liga MX season
2021–22 Liga MX Femenil season

References

External links
 Official website of Liga de Expansión MX

Liga de Expansión MX season